Susan (pronounced: Soo'san, born Golandam Taherkhani, May 1940 – May 2, 2004) was a popular Iranian singer of particularly the 1960s and 1970s.  Among her recordings was her 1969 release of "Kolah Makhmali" ("felt hat").

References

 Sousan
 Soosan
 Sousan; BBC Persian service

1942 births
2004 deaths
Iranian emigrants to the United States
20th-century Iranian women singers
Iranian pop singers
People from Kermanshah Province